Tozeur–Nefta International Airport  is an airport serving Tozeur in Tunisia.

Airlines and destinations
The following airlines operate regular scheduled and charter flights at Tozeur–Nefta Airport:

Trivia
 Two Boeing 747 aircraft of Iraqi Airways have been stored at this airport since the Gulf War. Saddam Hussein had put them there to protect the planes from the first Gulf War. They are waiting regulations of dispute with Kuwait in a new white paint and some traces of its original green color. They can be seen near the airport terminal and on satellite images. These are Boeing 747-200C (YI-AGP, c/n 22366) and Boeing 747SP (YI-ALM, c/n 22858).

References

External links
 Tunisian Civil Aviation and Airports Authority (OACA)
 
 

Airports in Tunisia
Airports established in 1978